Southern Railway Depot, also known as the Batesburg Boy Scout Hut, is a historic train station located at Batesburg-Leesville, Lexington County, South Carolina. It was built about 1900 by the Southern Railway, and is a one-story weatherboarded frame building with a bellcast hip roof. It has patterned metal shingle roofing and sawn wooden brackets supporting the deep eaves. It was relocated from its original location to its present site about 1960 and used as a meeting place for local Boy Scouts.

The building was listed on the National Register of Historic Places in 1983.

References 

Batesburg-Leesville
Railway stations on the National Register of Historic Places in South Carolina
Railway stations in the United States opened in 1900
Buildings and structures in Lexington County, South Carolina
National Register of Historic Places in Lexington County, South Carolina
Former railway stations in South Carolina